Rev. Canon Joseph Guinan (1863–1932) was an Irish Roman Catholic priest, teacher and novelist.

Biography
Joseph Guinan was born in King's County (now County Offaly) in 1863. He was educated at St. Mel's College, Longford, before going to St. Patrick's College, Maynooth to train as a priest. He was ordained by Dr. Batholmew Woodcock for the Diocese of Ardagh and Clonmacnoise. He served as a curate in Liverpool, returning to Ireland to teach English, Religion and Mathematics in St. Mel's College. Due to ill health he left teaching, and he was appointed parish priest of Bornacoola, County Leitrim, in 1910. He contributed the article on Henry Essex Edgeworth to the Catholic Encyclopedia. While in Dromod, Co. Longford in 1920 he was made a Canon of the Catholic Church.

Works
 The Soggarth Aroon by Rev. Joseph Guinan, Published by The Talbot Press Limited (1944)
 Scenes and Sketches in an Irish Parish or Priest and People in Doon by Rev. Joseph Guinan, Published by Dublin, Gill, Dublin (1910).
 The Moores of Glynn by Rev. Joseph Guinan. Published by Washbourne/Gill, London/Dublin (1907)
 Donal Kenny by Rev. Joseph Guinan, R. & T. Washbourne, Ltd., London, 1910.

References

20th-century Irish Roman Catholic priests
Irish novelists
People from County Offaly
Alumni of St Patrick's College, Maynooth
1863 births
1932 deaths
19th-century Irish Roman Catholic priests
Contributors to the Catholic Encyclopedia
People educated at St Mel's College